The 2019 NCAA Division III Football Championship Game, more commonly referred to as the 2019 Stagg Bowl or Stagg Bowl XLVII, was a postseason college football game that determined a national champion in NCAA Division III for the 2019 season. It was played at Woodforest Bank Stadium in Shenandoah, Texas, on December 20, 2019, with kickoff at 8:00 p.m. EST (7:00 p.m. local CST), and television coverage on ESPNU.

Teams
The participants of the 2019 NCAA Division III Football Championship Game were the finalists of the 2019 Division III Playoffs, a 32-team single-elimination bracket. The game featured North Central, seeking their first championship in their first appearance, and Wisconsin–Whitewater, seeking their seventh championship in their tenth appearance. This was the third meeting between the teams; Wisconsin–Whitewater led the series 2–0 entering the contest.

National semifinals

Game summary

Statistics

References

Stagg Bowl
North Central Cardinals football
Wisconsin–Whitewater Warhawks football
American football competitions in Texas
Stagg Bowl
Stagg Bowl